Zappa Plays Zappa is an American tribute act led by Dweezil Zappa, the elder son of late American composer and musician Frank Zappa, devoted to performing the music of Frank Zappa.

History 

The band debuted in 2006 with shows in Europe, Canada, and the United States during May and June (the tour was also known as Zappa Plays Zappa: Tour de Frank). The shows presented a collection of Frank Zappa's rock-oriented compositions from the 1960s to the late 1970s. Apart from Dweezil Zappa on lead guitar, many of the band members previously played with Frank Zappa. Among those, Napoleon Murphy Brock (sax, flute, and vocals) was an integral part of the band, while drummer/vocalist Terry Bozzio and guitarist Steve Vai performed as guests in parts of the shows. At several shows the live band played along with audio and video recordings of Frank Zappa himself, notably portions of "Chunga's Revenge", "Dumb All Over", "Cosmik Debris", and "Muffin Man".

After a break, the band played again in the U.S. during the fall of 2006, including a show in New York on October 31. That revived Frank Zappa's tradition of playing Halloween shows in New York. A DVD documenting the 2006 tour was released in early 2008.

In July and August 2007, the band played a North American tour, with a core lineup similar to that of the 2006 band. The band then played in Europe during September and October before returning to the US, starting with another Halloween show in New York. Special guest on the tour was vocalist and guitarist Ray White, a Zappa stalwart performer in the 1970s and early 1980s. They ended the 2007 tour in Australia in early December before doing a handful of shows in Japan in January 2008. Steve Vai returned as a guest on those shows. A brief tour of U.S. and Canadian dates was then scheduled for the Summer of 2008 with the same lineup as the 2007 tour.

At the 51st Grammy Awards in February 2009, Zappa Plays Zappa won Best Rock Instrumental Performance for their performance of the Frank Zappa instrumental classic "Peaches en Regalia".

Frank Zappa's bands underwent many changes of members, and Zappa Plays Zappa has done the same. The first changes came in 2009–2010, starting with the departure of Aaron Arntz from the keyboard chair, followed quickly by the replacement of guest vocalist Ray White with the hiring of full-time singer/multi-instrumentalist Ben Thomas. Shortly thereafter, keyboardist/singer Chris Norton was added to the lineup.

After the first few tours an additional event was added to the touring cycle. A music bootcamp created by Dweezil, aptly named Dweezilla, afforded the band the opportunity to teach students in a totally immersive environment. Dweezilla also created the opportunity for  certain alumni to participate in a performance.

In 2012, the band line up changed again. Original core band bassist Pete Griffin was let go. He was quickly replaced by Zappa alumni bassist Scott Thunes, who also used to be in Dweezil's band Z. He stood in while a permanent replacement was found. The next transformation of the band was complete when bassist Kurt Morgan joined.

Just as Frank Zappa's bands changed size year after year, Zappa Plays Zappa once again followed suit, reducing its membership to six rather than eight musicians. Original core band members Jamie Kime and Billy Hulting went on to other projects at that time.

The 2014 Zappa Plays Zappa tour was a tribute to the classic 1974 album Roxy and Elsewhere. ZPZ performed the material from Roxy in its entirety, in the same order as the original album.

The 2015 tour was also a tribute, this time to the album One Size Fits All and like the Roxy tour it celebrates its 40th anniversary. The show starts with a full performance of the album in its entirety, in the original order. The main set includes songs by the original lineup of The Mothers of Invention including "Who Needs the Peace Corps?" and "What's the Ugliest Part of Your Body?"

Trademark disputes
In April 2016, Dweezil Zappa announced that he would be changing the name of the band to Dweezil Zappa Plays Frank Zappa, in response to a cease-and-desist order by the Zappa Family Trust, which represents Zappa's estate. Following the October 2015 death of Gail Zappa, control of the trust was taken over by his siblings Ahmet and Diva Zappa, with Ahmet handling day-to-day operations. The trust holds a trademark on the name "Zappa Plays Zappa", which Dweezil had already licensed from Gail. Despite that, the Trust ordered Dweezil to cease using the trademark. The Trust also argued that his shows were a "dramatic work", thus ineligible for the blanket compulsory license for live performance venues as specified in section 115 of United States copyright law, and requiring Dweezil to negotiate "grand rights" directly from the trust or be liable for copyright infringement. Ahmet argued that he was not trying to inhibit his ability to tour under his father's name, but wanted to ensure that Zappa Plays Zappa would be "in accordance with the family trust". A lawyer interviewed by The New York Times disagreed with that theory, arguing that the concept of grand rights is intended primarily for works such as stage musicals, and that a concert by a cover band was not a "dramatic work". 

A lawyer representing the Trust later told Dweezil that "Dweezil Zappa Plays Frank Zappa" infringed on the Trust's trademarks for "Zappa" and "Frank Zappa". In June 2016, Dweezil announced that he would hold a tour to celebrate the 50th anniversary of the release of Zappa's first album, Freak Out!. In reference to the dispute, it was titled 50 Years of Frank: Dweezil Zappa Plays Whatever the F@%k He Wants – The Cease and Desist Tour.

The Zappa siblings reconciled in May 2018.

Albums
In 2012, ZPZ (consisting of Dweezil and an eight-piece band) released a double live album, F. O. H.—the abbreviation of "front of house", the technical term for the sound as it is mixed and amplified for the audience at a live venue. The tracks were recorded directly in two tracks, and no dubbing took place. Dweezil Zappa explained, though, that Universal Audio software was used to make individual compositions sound as if they were recorded with the equipment that his father used for those compositions.

 Musicians 2020 Touring Group:
 Dweezil Zappa – lead guitar, vocals 
 Scheila Gonzalez – saxophone, flute, keyboards, harmonica, vocals 
 Kurt Morgan – bass, vocals 
 Ryan Brown – drums, percussion, vocals 
 Adam Minkoff – guitar, keyboards, percussion, flute, recorder, mandolin, vocals 
 Kevin Bents – keyboards, vocals Former members:
 Aaron Arntz – keyboards, trumpet, vocals 
 Pete Griffin – bass 
 Joe Travers – drums, vocals 
 Billy Hulting – marimba, mallets, percussions 
 Jamie Kime – rhythm guitar, vocals 
 Ben Thomas – lead vocals, trumpet, trombone, rhythm guitar 
 Chris Norton – keyboards, violin, percussion, vocals 
 Scott Thunes – bass, vocals 
 Mikki Hommel – vocals 
 Cian Coey – vocals 
 David Luther – saxophone, guitar, keyboards, vocals Guests on most 2006 shows:
 Napoleon Murphy Brock – vocals, saxophone, flute
 Terry Bozzio – drums, vocals
 Steve Vai – guitarGuest on 2007, 2008 and some 2009 shows:
 Ray White – vocals, guitarGuests on some 2010 shows:
 George Duke – vocals, keyboard
 Scott Thunes – bass
 Jeff Simmons – bass, vocals
 Moon Zappa – vocalsGuests on some 2011 shows:
 Mark Volman – vocals
 Howard Kaylan – vocals
 Jean-Luc Ponty – violin
 Chick Corea – keyboards
 Frank Gambale – guitar
 Guthrie Govan – guitarGuest on some 2012 shows:
 Allan Holdsworth – guitar
 Chester Thompson – drums 
 Sioned Eleri Roberts – clarinetGuest on some 2015 shows Rachel Flowers – keyboards, guitar, vocals
 Vinnie Colaiuta – drums
 Tal Wilkenfeld – bassGuest on some 2017 shows'
 Ike Willis – vocals
 Vinnie Colaiuta – drums

Timeline

Discography

Live albums

Videos

References

External links 
Official website
Hidden Track – Review: Zappa Plays Zappa @ The Lincoln Theater

American experimental musical groups
American jazz ensembles from California
Rock music groups from California
Frank Zappa
Grammy Award winners
Musical groups from Los Angeles
Musical groups established in 2006
Tribute bands